98P/Takamizawa is a periodic comet in the Solar System.

References

External links 
 98P/Takamizawa – Seiichi Yoshida @ aerith.net
 98P at Kronk's Cometography
 

Periodic comets
0098
Comets in 2013
19840730